The Carmañola Americana (American Carmagnole) is a revolutionary song composed circa 1797 following the model of the French Carmagnole. In context, it was composed during the independentist movement of Manuel Gual and José María España. The song incited the population to revolt against dictatorial rule, seeking for freedom and independence. 

Currently, the Carmañola Americana is the anthem for the Vargas State, Venezuela.

Lyrics
Chorus 
Bailen los sin camisas 
y viva el son, 
bailen los sin camisas 
y viva el son del cañón.

I 
Yo que soy un sin camisa  
un baile tengo que dar 
y en lugar de guitarras, 
cañones sonaran. 

II 
Si alguno quiere saber 
por que estoy descamisado, 
porque con los tributos 
el rey me ha desnudado. 

III 
No hay exceso ni maldad 
que el rey no haya ejecutado 
no hay fuero, no hay derecho 
que no haya violado. 
 
IV 
Todos los reyes del mundo 
son igualmente tiranos 
y uno de los mayores 
es ese infame Carlos. 

V 
Todos ellos a porfía 
nos tiranizan furiosos, 
son crueles, son avaros, 
son soberbios y orgullosos. 

VI 
Pero no tardaran mucho 
en recibir su castigo, 
porque ya los sin camisas 
afilan sus cuchillos.

VII 
Los sanculotes en Francia 
al mundo hicieron temblar, 
mas los descamisados 
no se quedaran atrás. 

VIII 
De la ira americana 
ya podéis temblar, tiranos, 
que con los sin camisas 
vuestra hora ha llegado.

(Chorus)
(Instrumental)

IX 
Cuando por la libertad 
algún pueblo ha peleado, 
no hay ejemplo ninguno 
de haber sido humillado. 

X 
Dios protege nuestra causa, 
Él dirige nuestro brazo 
que el rey con sus delitos 
su justicia ha irritado. 

XI 
Florecerán nuestras artes, 
comercio y agricultura 
y viviremos todos 
en la paz más segura. 

XII 
La fraternidad a todos 
con sus frutos ligara 
y el fruto de su industria  
cada uno lograra.

See also
 List of anthems of Venezuela

Vargas (state)
Anthems of Venezuela
Spanish-language songs
Venezuelan War of Independence